Green Archers United F.C. was a Philippine football club which maintained a women's squad. The women's team of Green Archers United participated at the PFF Women's League, the top women's football league in the Philippines.  Amidst the COVID-19 pandemic in 2020, the club has disbanded.

Squad
As of 3 December 2016

 

Source: Pinay Futbol

Honors
 WFL Ladies Division
Runners-up (2): 2012–13, 2013–14

 UFL Youth League U17 Girls
Winner (2): 2014, 2015

Officials
As of 3 December 2016

References

Women's football clubs in the Philippines
PFF Women's League clubs
Association football clubs disestablished in 2020